Barbara Brown's titi monkey (Callicebus barbarabrownae), also popularly known as the blond titi monkey or northern Bahian blond titi, is a species of titi, a type of New World monkey. This critically endangered species is endemic to the Caatinga in northeastern Brazil, and it is estimated that less than 250 mature individuals remain. It is named after the zoologist Barbara Elaine Russell Brown.

Home range
The blonde titi monkey is listed as Critically Endangered due to small population size. The blond titi monkey is endemic to the Atlantic forests of eastern Brazil, where it is found in the coastal highlands of Bahia and Sergipe States. Most of their population is found between the Paraguaçu River (north) and Salvador (south), and west towards Mirorós. The estimated population is 260 individuals and is decreasing.

C. barbarabrownae has been listed among the World’s 25 Most Endangered Primates in 2012.

Habitat and ecology
The blond titi prefers habitats in caatinga a dry scrubland with preferences for dense arboreal caatinga. They do tend to be largely arboreal forest dwellers, and the blond titi monkey probably rarely descends to the ground. They are small in size and are agile primates, they are good climbers through the branches on all four limbs, using their rear limbs to jump long distances, grasping onto branches with leading forehands. While resting, they hunch their body, hanging the tail over a branch. .

Biology
The titi monkeys are most active at dawn and dusk foraging for fruits, leaves and insects, and rest at midday. The males will lead the group while foraging, communicating to the rest of the group with a wide array of vocalizations and visual signals. Titi monkeys are monogamous, with groups consisting of strongly-bonded parents and their offspring. Partners often reinforce the pair bond by perching side by side and entwining their tails.

Females give birth annually, during the wet season, to a litter of just one, after a gestation period of five to six months. Juveniles grow rapidly to reach adult size within ten months.

Major threat(s)
Since the titi monkey inhabits a region of Brazil they are subjected to a widespread of deforestation and habitat fragmentation. Cattle ranching, agriculture and continuing urbanization are the main threats. The area is in rapid development facilitated by an extensive network of highways. Other threats include potential dangers from roads and power-lines and predation by domestic pets. This species occurs in small fragmented populations that are exposed to synergistic genetic and demographic risks. Hunting pressure needs to be ascertained, but it is probably moderate due to the small body size. During surveys, a few individuals were found being kept as pets. The species is not found in any officially protected area.

Conservation
Despite being home to numerous species found nowhere else in the world, only one percent of the forests of Bahia, home to the blond titi monkey, are under any form of protection and as a number of destructive activities continue to degrade the area, action is required to protect the blond titi monkey's habitat. Several organizations, including the Brazilian Institute for the Environment, are working to promote the study and protection of Brazil's threatened primates. Conservation International is also helping to establish a Central Biodiversity Corridor that aims to connect fragmented forests, while WWF is developing an overall conservation strategy for Brazil's Atlantic forests. Further research is needed into the ecology and status of this enigmatic species if it is to be pulled back from the brink of extinction.

References

Barbara Brown's titi
Mammals of Brazil
Endemic fauna of Brazil
Barbara Brown's titi
Taxa named by Philip Hershkovitz